The 5th Best of Nollywood Awards was held at Dome, Asaba, Delta State on 5 December 2013. Several notable  personalities like Juliet Ibrahim, Omoni Oboli and Richard Mofe Damijo were in attendance. The Dark Comedy film Confusion Na Wa won the category Movie of the Year.

References

2013 in Nigerian cinema

2013 film awards

2013

Culture in Delta State

Entertainment events in Nigeria